The  has its source at Suzugaoka (鈴ヶ丘) in the city of Komatsu, Ishikawa Prefecture, Japan.

Geography 
The river flows from Suzugaoka, which is part of the same mountain chain as Mount Haku. It forms the southern border of Komatsu, separating it from Kaga.

References 

Rivers of Ishikawa Prefecture
Rivers of Japan